This article deals with the system of transport in Namibia, both public and private.

General

History
The beginnings of organised travel and transport routes in the territory of South West Africa, today Namibia, have not yet been established. This is due to the lack of any written records relating to roads prior to the twilight of the 19th century. Archaeological work has dated one stretch of road in the south-western Brandberg Massif to  1250 AD. Although no other such early examples have been found, it is certain that this road was not the only one of its kind.

The first permanent road, established for ox wagons, was built at the initiative of Heinrich Schmelen, Rhenish missionary in Bethanie in the early 19th century. It led from Bethanie to Angra Pequeña, today the town of Lüderitz, and was intended to serve the natural harbour there in order to become independent of the Cape Colony.

Road 

Namibia's road network is regarded as one of the best on the continent; road construction and maintenance adheres to international standards. The country's 48,875.27 km roads (2017) are administered by the Roads Authority, a state-owned enterprise established by Act 17 of 1999. Due to low traffic volumes the majority of roads are not tarred. The distribution of road surfaces is:
  standard bitumen road
  low-volume bitumen road. These roads have the same base layer as gravel roads but are covered with a thin layer of bitumen to reduce maintenance cost and dust formation.
  standard gravel road, covered with imported gravel.
  earth-graded road. These roads are built by clearing the vegetation and blading the surface. Compaction is achieved by the traffic using the road. Some of these roads are not graded at all but just consist of earth or sand tracks separated by vegetation. These tracks are in use where a daily usage of less than five vehicles is expected. 
  salt road. These roads consist of concentrated salt water and gypsum-rich material. They are only built near the Atlantic coast inside the mist belt.

Roads by region (2017) 

The major highways in Namibia are as follows:
  (freeway) from Windhoek to Okahandja, .
  in two discontinuous sections, first running  from Noordoewer (South African border) to the southern terminus of the A1 in Windhoek, then resuming at the northern terminus of the A1 in Okahandja and running  to Oshikango (Angolan border).
  from Walvis Bay to Okahandja, .
  from Ariamsvlei (South African border) to Grünau, .
  from Lüderitz to Keetmanshoop, .
  from Windhoek to Buitepos (Botswana border), .
  from Otavi via Katima Mulilo to Ngoma (Botswana border), .
  from the Ohangwena Region to Rundu, .
  from Nkurenkuru to Katwitwi (Angolan border), .
  from Grootfontein to Gobabis, .
  from Tsumeb to Mpungu, .

Road accidents
2018 there were about 393,062 cars registered in Namibia (169,911 in the capital Windhoek). Namibia has a relatively high prevalence of road accidents, compared to its sparse population. In 2011, 491 people died in 2,846 crashes. Causes are often speeding and reckless driving, as well as general non-observance of traffic rules. Stray animals are also a major cause of accidents, particularly in the Kavango Region.

Railway 
Rail transport in Namibia is operated on a 2,687-kilometre network by TransNamib.

Railway links to adjacent countries 

 Angola - There is currently no rail connection to Angola, although an agreement has been signed for link. Angola uses the same gauge,, as Namibia. (Rail transport in Angola)
 Botswana - There is currently no rail-link with Botswana, though the two countries use the same gauge. As of February 2011, construction on a Trans-Kalahari rail link between Botswanan coal fields and Walvis Bay was expected to begin in a year and a half. (Rail transport in Botswana)
 South Africa - There is a rail connection to South Africa; the two countries use the same  gauge. (Rail transport in South Africa)
 Zambia - There is currently no rail-link with Zambia, though the two countries use the same gauge. As of February 2011, there has been some talk of extending rail to the Zambian border. (Rail transport in Zambia)

Ports and harbours

Atlantic Ocean 

 Walvis Bay - railhead
 Lüderitz - railhead

Merchant marine 
none (2002, 1999 est.)

Airports 
Windhoek Hosea Kutako International Airport is the main international airport in the country. Two others international airports are Walvis Bay Airport and Eros Airport in Windhoek.

References

Notes

Literature